Lancaster Accords may refer to:

 Lancaster House Agreement, a 1979 ceasefire ending the Rhodesian Bush War
 Lancaster House Treaties, a 2010 Anglo-French military co-operation agreement

See also 
 Lancaster House Conferences (disambiguation)